The 1934 Colorado Buffaloes football team was an American football team that represented the University of Colorado as a member of the Rocky Mountain Conference (RMC) during the 1934 college football season. In its third and final year under head coach Bill Saunders, the team compiled a 6–1–2 record (6–1 against RMC opponents), finished in a three-way tie for the conference championship, and outscored all opponents by a total of 167 to 40.

Quarterback Kayo Lam led the team with 906 rushing yards and 8.24 yards per rush.  On October 27, 1934, Lam rushed for 232 yards against Colorado Agricultural, a total that remained a school record for 20 years. He also had a 91-yard run against BYU that also remained a school record until 1954.

In November 1934, the school adopted the nickname "Buffaloes" for its football team. The name was selected as part of a contest conducted by the school's student newspaper. Andrew J. Dickson was credited with submitting the winning name.

Schedule

References

Colorado
Colorado Buffaloes football seasons
Rocky Mountain Athletic Conference football champion seasons
Colorado Buffaloes football